Zor may refer to:

Places
Zor, Azerbaijan
Zor, Iran

Arts and entertainment
 Zor (film), a 1998 Bollywood film
 Zor, a fictional race in Super Dimension Cavalry Southern Cross
 Zor, a fictional character in the Robotech franchise
 Zor, a fictional alien race in Walter H. Hunt's series of books, starting with The Dark Wing
 Zor, a character in video game Sonic Lost World

People
 Balz "Zor" Meierhans, developer of game Ancient Anguish

See also